New Hampshire Route 128 (abbreviated NH 128) is a  north–south highway in southeastern New Hampshire. NH 128 runs from the Massachusetts border in Pelham northward to Londonderry, south of Manchester. NH 128 is named Mammoth Road throughout its entire length.

The southern terminus of NH 128 is at the Massachusetts state line in the town of Pelham, where the road continues into Massachusetts as an unnumbered road in the town of Dracut. The road, however, is still named Mammoth Road in Dracut. The northern terminus is at New Hampshire Route 28 in Londonderry. Mammoth Road continues northward along NH 28 and then New Hampshire Route 28A.

Major intersections

References

External links

 New Hampshire State Route 128 on Flickr

128
Transportation in Hillsborough County, New Hampshire
Transportation in Rockingham County, New Hampshire